Chloé Madeline Katz (born March 16, 1986, in New York, New York) is an American former competitive pair skater. With partner Joseph Lynch, she is the 2008 Couple de Nice silver medalist and the 2005 U.S. junior bronze medalist.  Katz competed as part of the U.S National Figure Skating Team from 2006 to 2011. She also earned eligibility to two Olympic Games, including an alternate position for the 2006 Olympic Team.  In August 2011, Katz and Lynch announced the end of their partnership.  Katz is currently pursuing a career in technology and is a graduate of New York University and Columbia Business School.

Competitive highlights

 N = Novice level; J = Junior level

References

 2004-2005 Junior Grand Prix USA Results

External links
 Official Web Site
 

1986 births
American female pair skaters
Living people
Sportspeople from New York City
21st-century American women
20th-century American women